The Church of St. George in Kneževo is Serbian Orthodox church in eastern Croatia. Church was built by the decision of the King of Yugoslavia Alexander I of Yugoslavia in 1929 as a part of the royal summer residence. There are two thrones, one for king and another one for queen, made of walnut wood which are part of interior of the church building.

See also
Eparchy of Osječko polje and Baranja
Kneževo
Serbs of Croatia
List of Serbian Orthodox churches in Croatia

References

Kneževo
20th-century Eastern Orthodox church buildings